Oanes is a small farming village in Strand Municipality in Rogaland county, Norway.  The village is located at the intersection between the Lysefjorden and Høgsfjorden, just north of the village of Forsand. The Norwegian National Road 13 runs through the village, just west of the Lysefjord Bridge. Oanes has a ferry quay for the Lauvvik–Oanes Ferry that crosses the Høgsfjorden as part of highway 13.

Prior to 2020, the village and surrounding area were part of Forsand municipality.

References

Villages in Rogaland
Ferry quays in Rogaland
Strand, Norway